The Leasing Foundation  (The Leasing Industry Philanthropic and Research Foundation Limited), established in 2012, is a non-profit organisation based in the City of London.

Mission
The mission of The Leasing Foundation is to support the business finance industry through personal and professional development.

Directors and Fellows
The Directors of the Leasing Foundation represent organisations including Lombard, Siemens Financial Services, Hitachi, Alfa, Aldermore, 1pm, Metro Bank, Wesleyan, Simply Asset Finance, Ricoh Europe and Locke Lord. The patron of the Leasing Foundation is Jonathan Andrew, Group Chief Executive, Siemens Financial Services. The Foundation has over 150 Fellows (as of February 2018) representing finance organisations from across Europe.

References

Foundations based in the United Kingdom
Business organisations based in London
Leasing